The 1952–53 DDR-Oberliga was the fourth season of the DDR-Oberliga, the first tier of league football in East Germany. 

The league was contested by seventeen teams, two less than in the previous season, and Dynamo Dresden won the championship after winning a necessary decider against BSG Wismut Aue 3–2 after extra time. It was the first of eight national championships for Dynamo but it would have to wait until 1970–71 to win its second one.

Harry Arlt of BSG Rotation Dresden was the league's top scorer with 26 goals.

Two clubs were renamed during the season, both in April 1953. SG Volkspolizei Dresden became SG Dynamo Dresden and SG Motor Gera was renamed to BSG Wismut Gera. SV Vorwärts der HVA Leipzig was first renamed SV Vorwärts der KVP Leipzig. The football team was then relocated to the East Berlin on 12 April 1953, where it continued as SV Vorwärts der KVP Berlin. Before the season SG Union Oberschöneweide had been renamed to BSG Motor Oberschöneweide, with both clubs relegated at the end of season, leaving East German capital without an Oberliga club for the following season. 

The 1952–53 season saw two of the most successful clubs in the East German championship adopt the name and location they would later be most successful under, police club SG Dynamo Dresden with eight and army club Vorwärts Berlin with six titles, second and third only to BFC Dynamo.

Table									
The 1952–53 season saw two newly promoted clubs, BSG Empor Lauter and BSG Motor Jena.  SV Vorwärts der KVP Leipzig was relocated to East Berlin during the season and continued as  SV Vorwärts der KVP Berlin.				

 Championship decider: Dynamo Dresden – BSG Wismut Aue 3–2 aet

Results

References

Sources

External links
 Das Deutsche Fussball Archiv  Historic German league tables

1952-53
Ober
1952–53 in East German football